Łagiewniki may refer to:

Divine Mercy Sanctuary (Kraków), commonly known as the Łagiewniki
Łagiewniki, Kościan County in Greater Poland Voivodeship (west-central Poland)
Łagiewniki, Krotoszyn County in Greater Poland Voivodeship (west-central Poland)
Łagiewniki, Poznań County in Greater Poland Voivodeship (west-central Poland)
Łagiewniki, Gmina Grodziec in Greater Poland Voivodeship (west-central Poland)
Łagiewniki, Gmina Sompolno in Greater Poland Voivodeship (west-central Poland)
Łagiewniki, Gmina Suchy Las in Greater Poland Voivodeship (west-central Poland)
Łagiewniki, Inowrocław County in Kuyavian-Pomeranian Voivodeship (north-central Poland)
Łagiewniki, Włocławek County in Kuyavian-Pomeranian Voivodeship (north-central Poland)
Łagiewniki, Radomsko County in Łódź Voivodeship (central Poland)
Łagiewniki, Sieradz County in Łódź Voivodeship (central Poland)
Łagiewniki, Wieluń County in Łódź Voivodeship (central Poland)
Łagiewniki, Lower Silesian Voivodeship (south-west Poland)
Łagiewniki, Lublin Voivodeship (east Poland)
Łagiewniki, Masovian Voivodeship (east-central Poland)
Łagiewniki, Busko County in Świętokrzyskie Voivodeship (south-central Poland)
Łagiewniki, Kielce County in Świętokrzyskie Voivodeship (south-central Poland)
Łagiewniki, West Pomeranian Voivodeship (north-west Poland)
Łagiewniki (Bytom), a district of the city of Bytom
 , a district of the city of Kraków
Łagiewniki (Łódź), a district of the city of Łódź
Łagiewniki, part of the Łagiewniki-Borek Fałęcki district of Kraków